This is a list of the Manitoba Liberal Party candidates in the 2016 provincial election. Some of the party's candidates have their own biography pages; information about others may be found here.

Candidates

References

2016